Coleophora diplodon is a moth of the family Coleophoridae. It is found in Russia.

References

diplodon
Moths described in 1993
Moths of Asia